Vakil Bath, Wakil Bath, or Wakil Hammam is an old public bathhouse (hammam) in Shiraz, Iran. It was a part of the royal district constructed during Karim Khan Zand's reign (1751–1779) which includes the Arg of Karim Khan, Vakil Bazaar, Vakil Mosque and many administrative buildings. It is located on the west side of the Vakil Mosque. The hammam was originally intended for use by the nobility and continued to be in use up until the 20th century.

It has since been restored and classified as a historic monument, inscribed with the number 917 on the list of national works of Iran.

References

Buildings and structures in Shiraz
Public baths in Iran